Eugène Delaplanche (28 February 1836 – 10 January 1891) was a French sculptor, born at Belleville (Seine).

Life
He was a pupil of Duret, gained the Prix de Rome in 1864 (spending 1864–67 at the Villa Medici in Rome), and the medal of honor in 1878. His "Messenger of Love" (1874), "Aurora" (1878), and the "Virgin of the Lillies" (1884), are in the Luxembourg. Other works by him are "Music" (1878, Paris Opera House), called his masterpiece; "Eve After the Fall" (1869); "Maternal Instruction" (1875, Square of Sainte-Clothilde, Paris); and the statues of "Security" and "Commerce" (1884) in the Hôtel de Ville, Paris (replicas in the Chicago Art Institute). He is also noted for his decorations in relief on vases of Haviland faience. His best work is naturalistic, but at the same time dignified and simple in line, and shows sound mastery of technique. He is represented by 15 works in the Glyptothek, Copenhagen, and in many other French museums and in churches.

Works in museums
 Musée d'Orsay, Paris
Virgin with a Lily, 1878, marble
 Africa, 1878, bronze, on the parvis of the museum
 Eve before the Fall, 1891, marble
 Eve after the Fall, c. 1869, marble
 Child riding a tortoise, 1866, bronze, Marseille, Musée des Beaux-Arts
 Allegory of Air, bronze, Compiègne, Musée Antoine Vivenel
 Allegory of Water, bronze, Compiègne, Musée Antoine Vivenel
 Study of a monk's head, c. 1870, marble, Le Puy-en-Velay, Musée Crozatier
 Saint Agnes, 1873, Église Sainte-Croix, Paulhan in Hérault
 Maternal education, 1875, square Samuel-Rousseau, 7th arrondissement, Paris.

Gallery

Sources

 Eugène Delaplanche in Père-Lachaise Cemetery 

Prix de Rome for sculpture
1836 births
1891 deaths
Sculptors from Paris
Burials at Père Lachaise Cemetery
19th-century French sculptors
French male sculptors
19th-century French male artists